Haeterius is a genus of clown beetles in the family Histeridae. There are at least 20 described species in Haeterius.

Species
 Haeterius blanchardi J. L. LeConte, 1878
 Haeterius brunneipennis (Randall, 1838)
 Haeterius californicus Horn, 1870
 Haeterius dietrichi Martin, 1922
 Haeterius exiguus Mann, 1911
 Haeterius ferrugineus (Olivier, 1789)
 Haeterius flavohirtus Krása, 1941
 Haeterius gratus Lewis, 1884
 Haeterius helenae Mann, 1914
 Haeterius hirsutus Martin, 1920
 Haeterius hubbardi Mann, 1924
 Haeterius minimus Fall, 1907
 Haeterius morsus J. L. LeConte, 1859
 Haeterius nudus Martin, 1922
 Haeterius optatus Lewis, 1884
 Haeterius ottomanus Mazur, 1981
 Haeterius pilosus Martin, 1922
 Haeterius plicicollis Fairmaire, 1876
 Haeterius schwarzi Mann, 1924
 Haeterius setosus Martin, 1922
 Haeterius strenuus Fall, 1917
 Haeterius tristriatus Horn, 1874
 Haeterius vandykei Martin, 1922
 Haeterius wagneri Ross, 1938
 Haeterius wheeleri Mann, 1911
 Haeterius williamsi Martin, 1920
 Haeterius zelus Fall, 1917

References

 Bousquet, Yves, and Serge Laplante (2006). "Coleoptera Histeridae". The Insects and Arachnids of Canada, part 24, xiii + 485.
 Tishechkin, Alexey K. (2007). "Phylogenetic Revision of the Genus Mesynodites (Coleoptera: Histeridae: Hetaeriinae) with Descriptions of New Tribes, Genera and Species". Sociobiology, vol. 49, no. 1, 1–167.

Further reading

 NCBI Taxonomy Browser, Haeterius
 Arnett, R.H. Jr., M. C. Thomas, P. E. Skelley and J. H. Frank. (eds.). (2002). American Beetles, Volume II: Polyphaga: Scarabaeoidea through Curculionoidea. CRC Press LLC, Boca Raton, FL.
 Arnett, Ross H. (2000). American Insects: A Handbook of the Insects of America North of Mexico. CRC Press.
 Richard E. White. (1983). Peterson Field Guides: Beetles. Houghton Mifflin Company.

Histeridae